Annette Obrestad (born 18 September 1988) is a Norwegian YouTuber and poker player. She is the youngest person to ever win a World Series of Poker bracelet, which she accomplished at the 2007 World Series of Poker Europe (WSOPE). She also runs a YouTube channel called Annette's Makeup Corner where she posts makeup tutorials and reviews, specializing in eyeshadow.

Poker

Online poker 
Annette Obrestad started her poker career online when she was only fifteen years old using the online screen-name "Annette_15." She claims she never had to deposit money on any online poker site, instead making her initial online bankroll by winning freeroll poker tournaments. Between September 2006 and February 2007, she won over $500,000 on Pokerstars, $200,000 on UltimateBet, and $136,000 on Full Tilt Poker. Pocketfives.com, a site that tracks online poker, ranked her number 51 in 2008. She also has been the site's top-ranked player in the past.

In July 2007, Obrestad won a $4 buy-in 180 person online sit-and-go where she claims to have played almost the entire tournament without looking at her cards. She has said she peeked at her cards once during the tournament, when she was faced with an all-in bet. She did this to show "just how important it is to play position and to pay attention to the players at the table."  On 2 March 2008 she won first place and $20,000 in the Stars Sunday Hundred Grand, a tournament with a buy-in of only $11 but with a field of 20,000 players. On 8 June 2008, she won first place and $35,000 in the Betfair Sunday $125k GTD Event. In December 2008 she won first place in the Ultimate Bet $100k GTD tournament. In May 2010, she won the Sunday 500 for $87,400.

Oberstad previously allied with the Betfair poker room and Full Tilt Poker. On 24 April 2012, she signed with Lock Poker.

World Series of Poker Europe 
On 17 September 2007 Obrestad won the inaugural World Series of Poker Europe Main Event the day before her 19th birthday.  By winning the one million-pound sterling (US$2.01 million at the time of the event) first prize she edged the record for a single-event payout to a female player set previously by poker professional Annie Duke when she won $2 million at the 2004 Tournament of Champions, which was an invitational event. Prior to the 2007 WSOPE, Obrestad had only cashed in four other live poker tournaments. Obrestad currently holds second place among Norwegian poker players in the all-time money list in live tournaments.

An "E" following a year denotes bracelet(s) won at the World Series of Poker Europe.

European Poker Tour 
Obrestad came close to winning her second major live title in November 2007, finishing in second place earning €297,800 ($431,184) at the 2007 PokerStars.com European Poker Tour Dublin event to Reuben Peters, after holding the chip lead throughout most of the final table.

, her total live tournament winnings exceeded $3.9 million.

Notes

1988 births
Norwegian poker players
World Series of Poker bracelet winners
World Series of Poker Europe Main Event winners
Female poker players
Living people
People from Sandnes
People from Rogaland
Place of birth missing (living people)